Arvilla may refer to:

Arvilla, North Dakota, a community in Grand Forks County, North Dakota, in the United States
Arvilla, West Virginia
, a US Navy patrol boat in commission from 1917 to 1919
Arvilla (grape), a Spanish wine grape